Donna Smith (born 17 January 1967) is an English former international women's football defender. She was a member of the England squad for the 1995 FIFA Women's World Cup Finals.

Club career
In 1995, Smith was playing for Croydon Women, after signing from Brighton & Hove Albion Women in 1994. A tall, strong and versatile defender, Smith won the club Players' and Manager's Player of the Year awards in Croydon's double winning 1995–96 season. Her other career as a firefighter allowed Smith to exhibit high fitness levels on the football pitch.

International career
Smith was a member of the England squad for the 1995 Women's World Cup, but failed to make an appearance.

References

1967 births
Living people
English women's footballers
England women's international footballers
FA Women's National League players
Charlton Athletic W.F.C. players
Brighton & Hove Albion W.F.C. players
1995 FIFA Women's World Cup players
Women's association football defenders